"One Day Too Late" is the fifth track on Skillet's 2009 album Awake. It was released as the seventh and final single on October 10, 2011. It made a various-artist compilation appearance on WOW Hits 2013.

Background and meaning 
John Cooper stated that he wrote "One Day Too Late" in reference to spending more time with his children and wife rather than concentrating too much on other activities in life.

Charts

References

2011 singles
Skillet (band) songs
Songs written by John Cooper (musician)
Songs written by Brian Howes
Song recordings produced by Howard Benson
Atlantic Records singles
2009 songs
Lava Records singles
Ardent Records singles

American alternative rock songs